Kopsia rajangensis is a tree in the family Apocynaceae. The specific epithet rajangensis refers to the Rajang River in Borneo, near which the species was initially surveyed.

Description
Its flowers feature a white corolla.

Distribution and habitat
Kopsia rajangensis is endemic to Borneo, where it is confined to Sarawak. Its habitat is hill forests.

References

rajangensis
Endemic flora of Borneo
Plants described in 2003